The 2023 season is the 133rd competitive association football season in New Zealand.

National teams

New Zealand men's national football team

Results and fixtures

Friendlies

New Zealand women's national football team

Results and fixtures

Friendlies

2023 FIFA Women's World Cup

Group A

New Zealand men's national under-23 football team

Results and fixtures

Friendlies

New Zealand national under-20 football team

Results and fixtures

2023 PSSI U-20 Mini Tournament

New Zealand women’s national under-20 football team

New Zealand national under-17 football team

Results and fixtures

2023 OFC U-17 Championship

Group B

Knockout stage

New Zealand women’s national under-17 football team

OFC Competitions

OFC Champions League

National play-offs

Men's football

National League

Northern League

Central League

Southern League

Cup Competitions

Chatham Cup

Final

Women's football

National Women's League

NRFL Women’s Premiership

Cup Competitions

Kate Sheppard Cup

Final

New clubs
FC Tauranga Moana (youth)
Ngongotahā Lakes
Palmerston North United

References

2023 in association football
Association football in New Zealand